Nitrobacter vulgaris is a rod-shaped, Gram-negative, and a chemoautotrophic bacterium. It plays an important role in the nitrogen cycle by oxidizing nitrite into nitrate in soil. It cannot tolerate highly alkaline (NH4+) conditions.

NO2- + 1/2O2 -> NO3-

Genomics 
Nitrobacter Genome Projects (from Genomes OnLine Database)
Comparative Analysis of Nitrobacter Genomes (at DOE's IMG system)

References

External links
Type strain of Nitrobacter vulgaris at BacDive -  the Bacterial Diversity Metadatabase

Nitrobacteraceae
Bacteria described in 2001